The Cocoon Mountains are a mountain range in Churchill County, Nevada. Nearby cities include Fallon and Reno.

References 

Mountain ranges of Nevada
Mountain ranges of Churchill County, Nevada